Jataí is a municipality in southern Goiás state, Brazil. Jataí is a major producer of agricultural products, including soybeans, rice, and corn. It has the largest herd of cattle in the state and is a large producer of poultry and swine. In 2000 it was the 6th largest municipality in area in the state.

Location
Jataí is located in the southwest part of the state at the confluence of the São Pedro and Claro rivers. Highway connections are made by BR-060 / Abadia de Goiás / Guapó / Indiara / Acreúna / Santo Antônio da Barra / Rio Verde. See Sepin

Geographical limits: Caiapônia, Mineiros, Itarumã, Aparecida do Rio Doce, Caçu, Cachoeira Alta, Rio Verde, Mineiros and Serranópolis.

Climate
Climate: Tropical mesothermic, with two seasons well defined by the seasonal regime of rain.
Period of rain: October to April. 
Period of drought: May to September.
Temperature: average minimum and maximum in June (coldest month) is: . In September (hottest month): . A surprising  was recorded on July 18, 2000.

Rivers
The municipality is located in the Serra do Caiapó, which divides the basins of the Araguaia and the Parnaíba rivers.  Its hydro graphic network belongs to the basin of the Paraná, being composed of tributaries on the right bank of the Parnaíba.

Rivers: Claro, São Pedro, Doce, Ariranha e Paraíso. 
The water is supplied by the Claro river and distributed to the population after treatment.

History
The history of Jataí, like that of all the southwest of Goiás, makes up the last phase of the expansion of cattle.  In 1836 José Manoel Vilela, from Minas Gerais, came from the east, crossing the Rio Verde.  He set up a cattle ranch on the banks of the Rio Claro.  Soon a settlement was formed with the name "Paraíso".  In 1864 a district was formed with the name Paraíso de Jataí.  The first church was built in 1867.  In 1882 the municipality of Paraíso was created.  Later, in 1885, the name was changed to Jataí.

Political data
Mayor:  HUMBERTO MACHADO
Vice-mayor:Geneilton Assis *Number of councilmembers:  10 
Total number of eligible voters: 57,325(2021)

Demographic data
Population density:  (2003)
Population in 1980: 53,394  (42,840  urban and 10,554   rural)
Population in 1991: 65,957  (55,593  urban and 10,364   rural)
Population in 2003: 79,398  (73,202  urban and  6,196   rural) (1)
Population in 2007: 81,972    (1)
(1)Estimated by logistic method

Population growth rate 1991/1996: 0.96.%
Population growth rate 1991/2000: 1.51.%
Population growth rate 1996/2000: 2.19.%
Population growth rate 2000/2007: 1.19%

Economy

Jataí has a number of small-sized commercial establishments and service-providing enterprises. Its economy is mostly based on agriculture (soy, rice, corn, beans, and bananas), cattle, pig, and chicken raising, although commerce and transformation industries—especially the clothing industry—play an important role, they are highly dependent on the town's agribusiness.  In 2005 the biggest employer was commerce with 3,811 workers, followed by public administration with 2,969 workers, and industry with 2,828 workers. (IBGE)

Economic data
Number of Industrial Establishments: 139 (2007) 
Industrial District: Distrito Agroindustrial - DAIJA  (Sept/2007) 
Meat-packing Plants/Egg collection: Gale Agroindustrial S/A (07/06/2005) 
Dairies: - Laticínios Dallas Ind. e Com. Ltda.; - Agromilk Indústria e Comércio de Laticínios Ltda.; - Dairy Partners Americas Manufacturing Brasil (07/06/2005) 
Banking Establishments: - -Banco ABN AMRO Real S.A. -Banco do Brasil S.A.(2) - BRADESCO S.A (2) - CEF - Banco Itaú S.A.(2) - HSBC Bank Brasil S.A –Banco Múltiplo   (August 2007)
Number of Retail Commercial Establishments: 1,124 (2007) 
Motor vehicles: 13,671 automobiles, 1,535 trucks, 3,248 pickup trucks, and 7,742 motorcycles. (2007)

Multinational enterprises in Jataí
 ADM - food processing company, headquartered in United States.
 Foods Brasil SA - food processing company in Brazil. 
 Cosan - national leader in the sugar-alcohol sector, the largest producer of sugar and ethanol in the world. 
 Louis Dreyfus Commodities - improved processing of food in Europe with headquarters in France. 
 Nestle - Processing of foods, headquartered in Switzerland.

Animal raising (2006)
Poultry: (head) 2,479,000
Cattle (head) 323,000
Swine: (head) 30,000
Milk cows (head): 42,300

Agricultural data (2006)
Farms: 1,590
Planted area: 
Natural Pasture: 
Woodland and Forest: 
Persons occupied related to the farm owner: 3,013
Persons occupied not related to the farm owner: 3,060
Main crops:  soybeans, corn, soybeans, sorghum, sunflowers, and wheat.

Infrastructure

There are three institutes of higher education, including a campus of the Federal University of Goiás.  This campus features 9 courses distributed in three academic units: the Center of Human Sciences, Letters, and Exact Sciences, the Center of Physical Education and the Center of Agricultural and Biological Sciences.

In the health sector there were four hospitals, 11 clinics, and one maternity.

In communications there were 5 radio stations and two local television stations.  In addition there were 2 newspapers.

Education (2006)
Schools in activity: 64 with 24,600 students
Higher education: - Centro de Ensino Superior de Jataí (CESUT) - Federal University of Jatai (UFJ) - Pólo Universitário da UEG - Instituto Federal de Goiás (IFG)
Literacy Rate: 89.8%

Health (2007)
Hospitals:  5
Beds: 198
Walk-in health clinics:  27
Infant mortality rate: 17.77 (in 1,000 live births)

The Human Development Index

Municipal Human Development Index MHDI:  0.793
State ranking: 15 (out of 242 municipalities)
National ranking: 740 (out of 5,507 municipalities)

Data are from 2000

See also
 List of municipalities in Goiás

References

Frigoletto
 Sepin

External links

Prefeitura de Jataí
Jataí Campus of Universidade Federal de Goiás

Municipalities in Goiás
Planned cities in Brazil